The Hunter 35.5 Legend is an American sailboat, that was designed as a cruiser and introduced in 1986.

The Hunter 35 Legend was developed into the Hunter 35.5 Legend in 1989, which replaced it in production.

Production
The boat was built by Hunter Marine in the United States between 1986 and 1989.

Design
The Hunter 35 Legend is a small recreational keelboat, built predominantly of fiberglass, with wood trim. It has a fractional sloop rig, a raked stem, a reverse transom, an internally-mounted spade-type rudder controlled by a wheel and a fixed fin or optionally, winged keel. It displaces  and carries  of ballast.

See also
List of sailing boat types

Related development
Hunter 35.5 Legend

Similar sailboats
C&C 34/36
C&C 35
C&C 36R
Cal 35
Cal 35 Cruise
Express 35
Hughes 36
Hughes-Columbia 36
Hunter 356
Island Packet 35
Landfall 35
Mirage 35
Niagara 35
Southern Cross 35

References

Keelboats
1980s sailboat type designs
Sailing yachts
Sailboat types built by Hunter Marine